Benacre is a village and civil parish in the East Suffolk district of the English county of Suffolk. Neighbouring villages include Kessingland and Covehithe with the town of Southwold  to the south.

The village is dispersed around Benacre Hall, the estate of the Gooch family. It had a population of around 70 in mid-2008. The population declined dramatically during the 20th century from 216 at the 1901 census.  The area of the parish extends from the Hundred River in the north to Benacre Broad in the south.

At the Domesday survey the village's name is given as Benagra within the Hundred of Blythling. It formed part of the holdings of the Abbey of Bury St Edmunds, as it had before the conquest, with one freeman recorded as living in the manor.

The village has few basic services. The former parish church of St Michael is now privately owned by the Gooch family. It is medieval in origin and a Grade II* listed building, although extensively rebuilt following a fire in the 18th century. The church of St Andrew in Covehithe now acts as the parish church for Benacre.

Benacre Broad forms part of the Benacre National Nature Reserve, an important reserve for over 100 bird species including the marsh harrier, little tern and bittern. The shingle beach also forms an important habitat and the coastal area of the parish is part of the Pakefield to Easton Barents Site of Special Scientific Interest.

References

External links
Benacre Estate

Villages in Suffolk
Civil parishes in Suffolk
Waveney District